Minneapolis Business College (MBC) was a for-profit career college in Roseville, Minnesota.   It was founded in 1874 and moved to its current suburban location in 1983.  It had nearby housing for students but over half of students came from the immediate Twin Cities area. MBC awarded diplomas and associate degrees. It closed in December 2019.

Student body, admissions, and outcomes 
According to Peterson's and recent institutional publications, Minneapolis Business College had an undergraduate population of 267.  Of 509 applicants, 439 (or 86%) were admitted.  According to College Navigator, the most recent graduation rate was 83%.

Academics 
Minneapolis Business College provides career-focused courses to high school graduates. MBC grouped its ten major areas of study into three main categories: Business, Technology, and Health Care.

Accreditation 
Minneapolis Business College was accredited by the Accrediting Council for Independent Colleges and Schools  to award diplomas and associate degrees.
The Medical Assisting Program was accredited by the Commission on Accreditation of Allied Health Education Programs.

Closure 
On June 26, 2019, Bradford Schools, the parent company of Minneapolis Business College, announced that they would be closing the school in December of the same year. The 90 current students were allowed to complete their programs and limited staff stayed on through June 2020 to assist graduates with job placement.

References

External links
 Official website

1874 establishments in Minnesota
Buildings and structures in Roseville, Minnesota
Educational institutions established in 1874
For-profit universities and colleges in the United States
Graphic design schools in the United States
Universities and colleges in Ramsey County, Minnesota